Jack Newsome (born April 17, 1996) is an American singer, songwriter, and record producer. Newsome was a member of the band NY5, and subsequently the Berlin-based band New District, but ultimately chose to pursue his solo career and education at the Berklee College of Music. In 2016, he released the debut extended play, Medicine. He first gained recognition as a solo artist when he contributed the vocals for "Affection" by Said the Sky and Origami with five million views on YouTube. As a songwriter and producer, he has worked with a range of artists, including Meghan Trainor, Ryan Tedder, Grey, and Sean Kingston.

In June 2019, Newsome achieved national recognition when he appeared on the reality songwriting competition series, Songland, in which he performed "Lying (Next to You)". Following the appearance, he signed with Smack Songs as a singer-songwriter in November 2019.

Early life 
Jack Newsome was born April 17, 1996, in Rumson, New Jersey, the United States, to Doug and Kimberly. Newsome started playing music at the age of six, and independently released the song "The Holiday Call" in 2007. Since the release of the single "Fly" in 2010, he continuously released several materials, including the studio album, Songs from the Garage (2011).

Career

2012-2015: NY5 and New District 
During junior year of high school, Newsome joined the Manhattan-based boy band, NY5, along with the four other members including Dylan Hartigan, who later competed on the fourteenth season of The Voice. The band released the debut single, "NYC Girls" in July 2013, but soon went inactive. After the disbandment of NY5, Newsome moved to Berlin, Germany to work with the boy band, New District, however decided to pursue his solo career and study at Berklee College of Music in Boston. Later, New District was nominated at the 2016 Teen Choice Awards for the Next Big Thing category.

2016-present: Solo career 
In February 2016, Newsome opened for Phillip Phillips at The Stone Pony along with A Great Big World and Matt Nathanson. Newsome independently released his debut extended play, Medicine in March 2016. The following single, "Bellevue" was well-received by several music media, including Kick Kick Snare and Girl's Life. In 2017, Newsome moved to Los Angeles and made money working as a session singer, while contributing the vocals for Said the Sky and Origami song, "Affection" (2018) and writing songs for the artists such as Plvtinum and Matt Sato.

In June 2019, Newsome appeared in the third episode of the songwriting competition series, Songland, where he wrote and performed "Lying (Next to You)", co-written by Ryan Tedder, Ester Dean, Elsa Curran, Christina Galligan, Andrew DeRoberts, and Shane McAnally, who also produced the song. Although the song was not chosen by the guest artist, Kelsea Ballerini, the appearance earned him national recognition and led him to write Meghan Trainor song, "Hurt Me". "Lying (Next to You)" has been streamed more than a million times on Spotify as of September 2020. Following the appearance, Newsome signed with the label, Smack Songs as a singer-songwriter. His first single from the label, "All My Friends Are Falling in Love" was released in February 2020. The song was used in the American reality television series, Love Island in September 2020.

Discography

Albums

Studio albums

Extended plays

Singles

As a lead artist

As a featured artist

Promotional singles

Other appearances

Music videos

Songwriting and production credits
 indicates a song that was released as a single.

Filmography

Awards and nominations

Notes

References

External links
 
 

1996 births
Living people
21st-century American singers
21st-century American male singers
American dance musicians
American electronic musicians
American male pop singers
Berklee College of Music alumni
Electropop musicians
People from Rumson, New Jersey
Singers from New Jersey
Songwriters from New Jersey
American male songwriters